The 2015 World Senior Curling Championships was from 18 to 25 April at the Iceberg Skating Palace in Sochi, Russia. The event was held in conjunction with the 2015 World Mixed Doubles Curling Championship.

Men

Round-robin standings
Final round-robin standings

Playoffs

Bronze-medal game
Saturday 25 April, 13:00

Gold-medal game
Saturday 25 April, 13:00

Women

Round-robin standings
Final round-robin standings

Playoffs

Bronze-medal game
Saturday 25 April, 13:00

Gold-medal game
Saturday 25 April, 13:00

References

External links

World Senior Curling Championships
2015 in curling
2015 in Russian sport
Sports competitions in Sochi
International curling competitions hosted by Russia
April 2015 sports events in Russia
21st century in Sochi